Andromeda, in comics, may refer to:

 Andromeda (DC Comics), the codename of the Legion of Super-Heroes member Laurel Gand 
 Andromeda (Marvel Comics), a native of Atlantis and member of the Defenders
 Andromeda (Pantheon), a member of the superhero family the Pantheon
 Andromeda Shun, a Bronze Saint in Saint Seiya

See also
Andromeda (disambiguation)